Gliese 777, often abbreviated as Gl 777 or GJ 777, is a yellow subgiant approximately 52 light-years away in the constellation of Cygnus.  The system is also a binary star system made up of two stars and possibly a third. As of 2005, two extrasolar planets are known to orbit the primary star.

Stellar components 

The primary star of the system (catalogued as Gliese 777A) is a yellow subgiant, a Sun-like star that is ceasing fusing hydrogen in its core. The star is much older than the Sun, about 6.7 billion years old. It is 4% less massive than the Sun. It is also rather metal-rich, having about 70% more "metals" (elements heavier than helium) than the Sun, which is typical for stars with extrasolar planets.

The secondary star (Gliese 777B) is a distant, dim red dwarf star orbiting the primary at a distance of 3,000 astronomical units. One orbit takes at least tens of thousands of years to complete.  The star itself may be a binary, the secondary being a very dim red dwarf.  Not much information is available on the star system.

Planetary system 

In 2002, a discovery of a long-period, wide-orbiting, planet (Gliese 777b) was announced by the Geneva extrasolar planet search team.  The planet was estimated to orbit in a circular path with low orbital eccentricity, but that estimate was increased with later measurements (e=0.36).  Initially therefore, the planet was believed to be a true "Jupiter-twin" but was later redefined as being more like an "eccentric Jupiter", with a mass of at least 1.5 times Jupiter and about the same size. In 2021, the true mass of Gliese 777 Ab was measured via astrometry.

In 2005, further observation of the star showed another amplitude with a period of 17.1 days. The mass of this second planet (Gliese 777c) was only 18 times more than Earth, or about the same as Neptune, indicating it was one of the smallest planets discovered at the time. It too was initially thought to be on a circular orbital path that with later measurements turned out to be not the case. 

There was a METI message sent to Gliese 777. It was transmitted from Eurasia's largest radar, 70-meter Eupatoria Planetary Radar. The message was named Cosmic Call 1; it was sent on July 1, 1999, and it will arrive at Gliese 777 in April 2051.

See also 
 47 Ursae Majoris
 51 Pegasi
 Gliese 229

References

External links 
 Extrasolar Planet Interactions by Rory Barnes & Richard Greenberg, Lunar and Planetary Lab, University of Arizona

Binary stars
Cygnus (constellation)
190360
098767
7670
0777
M-type main-sequence stars
G-type subgiants
Planetary systems with two confirmed planets
Durchmusterung objects
TIC objects